Thalun (17 June 1584 – 27 August 1648) was the eighth king of Toungoo dynasty of Burma (Myanmar). During his 19-year reign, Thalun successfully rebuilt the war-torn country which had been under constant warfare for nearly a century since the 1530s. Thalun instituted many administrative reforms and rebuilt the economy of the kingdom.

In 1608, Anaukpetlun captured Prome and made Thalun the governor of Prome. In 1628, Anaukpetlun was murdered by his own son Minyedeippa who made himself king. Thalun was then on his campaigns against the Shans at Kengtung with his brother Minye Kyawswa II, the governor of Ava. However, the death of Anaukpetlun forced the two to return to Pegu to claim the throne from the unlawful king and to counter the opportunistic Arakanese invasions. Thalun became the center of rallying against Minyedaikpa and was proclaimed the crown prince.

In 1630, Thalun and Minye Kyawswa were able to take Pegu and executed Minyedeippa. At Pegu, there was an assassination attempt by a Mon on King Thalun, which resulted in the massacre of the Mons.

Thalun fought a three-year campaign against Lanna, finally subjugating them in 1632.  In 1634, Thalun moved the capital to Ava and crowned himself king of Ava and made his brother Minye Kyawswa crown prince, Maha Uparaja.  Thalun then concentrated on building pagodas and other works of merit.

However, Minye Kyawswa died on 28 August 1648. Thalun then made his own son Pindale as the crown prince. The son of Minye Kyawswa who wanted the crown prince title for himself staged a rebellion. The palace was sacked and Thalun fled to Sagaing. However, the rebellion was soon put down and the conspirators were burnt alive. Thalun died on 19 October 1648, succeeded by his son Pindale.

Notes

References

External links
 .

Rulers of Toungoo
1584 births
1648 deaths
17th-century Burmese monarchs